PHOENIX is a multipurpose Radar Data Processing System(RDPS) / Surveillance Data Processing System (SDPS) - a.k.a. tracker - used for many ATC applications in the Deutsche Flugsicherung (DFS), and is continuously extended and maintained ever since. PHOENIX is also foreseen as a fundamental component for all future ATM systems in the DFS into the 2020s and part of the DFS initiative for “ATS componentware” in the European SESAR programme.

Introduction 

Since 2001, the DFS has developed its own radar and sensor data processing system, called PHOENIX (a programmatic name instead of an acronym), which is applied in a variety of environments, for a variety of purposes, and with a variety of functional requirements. With PHOENIX the DFS aimed at the level of an advanced ATC system in terms of the previous definitions, not to ATM. To meet these challenges a series of general concepts had been developed and implemented, which are of general interest for the definition and implementation of advanced ATC and C³ systems.

The PHOENIX tracker was originally developed for the surveillance of civilian ATC traffic. It is capable to perform MSDF utilizing very different sensor types regarding accuracy, update rates, as well as their supported attributes. Due to its flexible design it is perfectly suitable for surface movement ground surveillance.

Grand context 
German air traffic of today comprises between 1,000 and 2,000 aircraft tracks at the same time in the national airspace. Besides classical ATC radars also new types of sensors or position information sources like Multilateration, ADS-B, and others are to be integrated. Per day it is required to process up to 10,000 flight plans. In the context of the discussion and development of transnational functional airspaces block like FABEC the required number of maintainable tracks will even grow beyond the 3,000, possibly more than 5,000 simultaneous tracks. An equivalent growth in needed flightplan handling capacity can be reasonably assumed. Each aircraft needs suitable Kalman filtering for tracking to cope both with steady flight and manoeuvre conditions in the different airspaces, and each IFR aircraft needs linkage processing to correlate flightplan data correctly to the track; simple code-callsign-pairing is insufficient due to multiple use of SSR codes.

At the same time the track and flightplan data have to be presented to a number of controller workstations (CWPs), ranging from 1 (low-end applications) or 5 (in towers) to 120 (in ACCs), which results in the demand of an excellent scalability for such a system. Furthermore, CWPs will create much coordination data and additional track-related information which are distributed over the LAN and eventually to external partner systems. To keep the total complex still controllable, system status monitoring and commanding facilities have to be inbuilt. Last but not least such system environments need large sets of configuration and resource data that have to be managed efficiently.

Phoenix deployment 
PHOENIX is a common R/SDPS tool in the German ATC world, used at more than 150 operational locations, scheduled for more than 700 additional locations, and used as a test, analysis, and evaluation tool in more than 200 locations. 
Today, PHOENIX is an international R/SDPS tool with system recognised internationally.

Phoenix Paradigm

Phoenix As ATS Component  

Phoenix has been developed following the decomposition of ATS componentware (ATS CW): 
 ATS units shall be regarded as "system of systems",
e.g. a system for each decomposed domain. An ATS systems may consist of subsystems,
e.g. an ACC ATS system may consist of a subsystem "Main" and a subsystem "Fallback". ATS systems or subsystems always comprise Hardware (HW),
Software (SW), and Network Infrastructure (NET). HW, SW, NET consist of segments, e.g.
a HW segment is a single host,
a SW segment is the application SW for a host,
a NET segment is a LAN segment. SW segments consist of components,
Components are executable (UNIX/LINUX) processes and/or scripts

Phoenix Tracking Engineering 

PHOENIX includes a 2 track server configuration, one with an IMMKF and another with a 1MKF. Targets with different manoeuvrability have different statistics, which is expressed by the process noise of the motion model. The process noise is a mathematical description for the uncertainty of a future position and velocity target given the current and past observations. Targets for which constant motion is an established fact essentially have zero process noise, and all uncertainties due to changes to the targets’ motion state are modelled by nonzero process noise.

Phoenix Software Engineering 

PHOENIX is based on the use of Commercial Off-The-Shelf hardware and software, on the LINUX operating system, and on a modular Air Traffic Control (ATC) system philosophy. The existing system with its open architecture design is adaptable and scalable ranging from a simple tower automation application over a complex approach application up to an independent air traffic control fallback solution for a multi sector area control centre.

Phoenix Standards 

The development and evolution of the PHOENIX product has been based on compliance with internationally accepted standards for air traffic management systems including operational, safety, security and equipment standards promulgated by organisations such as ICAO, EUROCONTROL and other recognized organisations.

Phoenix Components

Server 

 Multi radar track servers (1MKF, IMMKF, MSDF; d-mrts)
 Track distribution services (d-trksend)
 Configuration and distribution servers (d-dis)
 Recording and replay servers (d-rdr)
 Message servers (d-msg)
 Flightplan and Linkage processing servers (d-fps)
 Persistence Servers (d-pds)
 Information Data Server for direction finders and weather reports (d-ids)
 Radar weather server (d-ws)
 Safety Net Server for STCA, RAI, MSAW, GPM (d-snet)
 Airport Situation Assessment Server for RWY incursions, TWY infringements, etc. (d-asas)
 Online tracking quality control statistics server (d-otqc)
 LANBLF Interface and Proxy
 FATMAC interface and TWRTID Server

Client 

 Controller Working Position (d-cwp)
 Tower Touch Input Approach Display (twrtid)
 Flight Data Workstation (d-fdb)
 Analysis Working Position (d-awp)
 Maintenance Working Position (MWP) with:
  Adaptation Data Editor (d-adg)
 Configuration distribution HMI (d-disfront)
 Map Editor (d-map)
 System Monitoring (d-mon)

Support processes (daemons, interface agents, utilities) 
 Proxies for PHOENIX middleware (proxy_server)
 Status collector agents (d-agent)
 Application initialisation agents (d-init)
 Interface agents for various flightplan data formats (d-fplIa)
 Bridges for sensor data, flightplan messages (d-sbr,...)
 Interfaces to various printers
 Test data generators (d-gen, d-stca, etc.)
 Video switch controllers

Phoenix History

References

Main Source 

 Heidger, R. (2010): The Phoenix White Paper

Other references 

 Engels, K.; Heidger, R. (2008): An Infrastructure for Online Tracking Quality Control. In: ESAVS 2008 conference proceedings, Capri, Italy 2008.
 Heidger, R., Klenner, T., Mallwitz, R. (2003): Mode S evaluation and practical implementation results with the DFS Multiradar-Tracking system PHOENIX. In: International Radar Symposium 2003 Proceedings, Deutsche Gesellschaft für Ortung und Navigation, Bonn 2003 und Navigation, Bonn 2003
 Heidger, R., Klenner, T., Lauterbach, K. (2005): PHOENIX Interface Control Document. Version 1.0, DFS, Langen, Dec. 2005.
 Heidger, R., Klenner, T., Mallwitz, R. (2004): The PHOENIX Multi-Radar Tracker System for Air Traffic Control Applications. pp. 193–222, in: Air Traffic Control Quarterly. Vol. 12, Number 3, 2004.
 Heidger, R. (2005): A distributed system architecture for scalable sensor data processing ATC systems. In: 2nd International Workshop on Intelligent Transportation (WIT 2005). Conference Proceedings, TU Hamburg 2005.
 Heidger, R.; Nguyen, Ha Son (2007): An analysis working position for radar data processing quality control. In: ESAVS 2007 conference proceedings, Bonn, 2007.
 Heidger, R.; Mathias, A. (2008): Multiradar Tracking in PHOENIX and its Extension to Fusion with ADS-B and Multilateration. EuRAD 2008.
 Heidger, R.; Natchev, R. (2008): Trajectory computation for tracker evaluation and linkage processing. In: ESAV conference proceedings (2008), Capri, Italy.
 Heidger, R. (2010a): Fallback Strategies and Fallback Systems in the DFS ATM Infrastructure. In: Proc. Enhanced Surveillance of Aircraft and Vehicles (ESAVS 2010), Berlin, Germany, March 16 17, 2010.
 Heidger, R. (2010b): Innovations in the Surveillance Infrastructure at the DFS. In: Skyways ATC Magazine. Eurocontrol, Brussels, Belgium.
 Heidger, R., Mathias, A.; Pourvoyeur, K. (2010): Multi-Sensor Data-Fusion for Combined Air and Ground Situation Awareness. In: Proc. Enhanced Surveillance of Aircraft and Vehicles (ESAVS 2010), Berlin, Germany, March 16 17, 2010.
 Mathias, A.; Pourvoyeur, K. (2010): “Enhanced IMM Model Switching using Residual Accumulation,” in Proc. Enhanced Surveillance of Aircraft and Vehicles (ESAVS 2010), Berlin, Germany, March 16 17, 2010.

Air traffic control systems